Horațiu Daniel Cioloboc (born 29 September 1967) is a Romanian former footballer who played as a midfielder.

International career
Horațiu Cioloboc played two friendly games at international level for Romania against Egypt.

Honours
ASA Târgu Mureș
Divizia B: 1990–91
Universitatea Craiova
Cupa României: 1992–93

Notes

References

1967 births
Living people
Romanian footballers
Romania international footballers
Association football midfielders
Liga I players
Liga II players
ASA Târgu Mureș (1962) players
ASC Oțelul Galați players
FC U Craiova 1948 players
FC Universitatea Cluj players
ACF Gloria Bistrița players